Verona is a Venezuelan rock band formed in Punto Fijo in 2000 by Chevy (guitar and vocals), Atari (guitar and backing vocals), Paúl Jatem (bass guitar), and Eduardo (drums). In 2001, they recorded their first EP, Delirium, which included earlier recordings from Chevy. Paúl left the band in 2003 and was replaced by Adolfo Alcala. Alcala was credited with the composition of Verona's first LP, Summer Consequence, but he left before its recording. He was replaced by Ray Diaz in December 2003. In May 2004, Verona released Summer Consequence. They went on to release their second LP, Anywhere in March 2008.

Moving to Caracas and Delirium EP (2000–2002)
In October 2001, Verona began to record "Delirium" and "Pagina Ven," two of the five songs that appeared on the Delirium EP. The other songs, "Hoy," "Make a Wish," and "Automatic" were recordings from Chevy's first solo project. The EP was never officially released; but distributed between friends, and online through their first web page. At the end of the year, Verona moved to Caracas looking for better opportunities and places to perform.

Verona ceased activities in 2002 due to other commitments of the members. They were back in Caracas at the Jim Morrison Festival, their first show there.

Summer Consequence (2003–2004)

Verona recruited Adolfo Alcala after Paul Jatem left the band in 2003. Alcala helped the band establish themselves in the underground movement in the city. That year, they played the "Alma Mater Festival."

Alcala left the band for academic reasons in 2003 and was replaced by E.W.'s former bass guitar player, Ray Diaz. Diaz was not very involved with Verona's musical influences, but it turned out that he fit very well in the band. He said in 2003, "I'm not familiar with Verona's influences, but I will do my best to contribute in whatever I can." At this point, he was not confirmed as a full-time member of Verona, but he filled in on bass guitar for live shows and their first LP recording, Summer Consequence. This new album was produced by Verona's first bass guitar player, Paul Jatem, and the band itself. It was released on May 20, 2004.

Summer Consequence has eleven songs, including re-mastered versions of "Make a Wish" and "Delirium" from the Delirium EP. Chevy said: "We like this two songs, it would be a shame having them recorded and not give them the appropriate distribution." Summer Consequence received very positive reviews from critics, including several reviews by Rolling Stone Latin America magazine. It was included in the Best 50 Albums of 2004.

In October 2004, when Diaz was officially announced as a full-time member of the band, they started filming their first music video, made for the single "Beautiful." Atari was the director along with Vanessa Henriquez and VJ Zion. Beautiful's music video was first shown on national television on June 5, 2004.

"Anywhere" and "Mark of Excellence" single (2005–2008)

In mid-2005, Verona went back to the studio to record demos that in the end became an album. They recorded four tracks: "Wondering Mind," "Broken Promise," "I'm you," and a new wave version of "Make a Wish." "Wondering Mind" was the first song completely composed by the four members of the band.

In late 2005, Verona took another big break. Goitia and Diaz played a couple of shows with their former bands, while Chevy and Atari were focused on solo recordings.

In 2006, Verona continued recording their songs and finished by the end the year. In the beginning, the album was thought to have two songs in Spanish, including a version of "Mourning Days" and "Dead or Alive" (unreleased). "Dead or Alive" was excluded from the album and was replaced by "Mark of Excellence," which was composed by Atari and Chevy. Chevy said: "We initially thought that recording something in Spanish would work for us, we'd probably get radio airtime, but this is not what Verona is about." Atari added: "In the other hand, Mark of Excellence defines this new process that we are going through, this is the music style we have always been looking for..."

Anywhere included guest appearances by Håkan Löfdahl (the lead singer for Swedish band The Last Hours) and Jean Carlo de Oliveira (Candy 66's lead singer). All tracks were mixed by Jean Carlo de Oliveira, except for "Mark of Excellence," which was mixed by Håkan Löfdahl and "Piano for a Friend," mixed by Juan Carlos Nieto.

"Mark of Excellence" was released on May 25, 2007. To the band's surprise, the song received airtime nationwide, making Verona the first Venezuelan English singing band to achieve this. Venezuela's laws states that: "local bands have to follow certain rules in order to get airtime, which include singing in Spanish. Airtime in the country is divided in two, 70% Spanish singing national bands and 30% for other languages and international bands." This single was included in that 30%, competing with the best bands around the world. "Mourning Days" also received airtime as Anywheres second single.

On October 5, 2007, Verona won an Urbe award for "Best Non-Capital Band," i.e. nominated and voted by the public as the best band in Venezuela that is not from Caracas. Verona could not compete in the nomination for “Best Capital Band” since all band members are from another state.

On March 20, 2008, Anywhere was released. It has twelve tracks. Urbe magazine (the most important alternative newspaper in the country) placed Anywhere in the top five albums in Venezuela.

To support the release of Anywhere, Verona started a national tour which also included three acoustic live performances in California and Florida. A successful Stone Temple Pilots tribute in Caracas, sponsored by La Mega Radio Station, followed the tour.

"Silent Night" cover and new album recording (2009)
The members of Verona have not worked together since their last show in 2009. Although they have been seen together at a few concerts, Atari made a special guest appearance at The Ataris show on July 22.  He was invited to play guitars in "Takeoffs and Landings" and "In This Diary," while the Indiana band performed in Caracas as a part of their Latin American tour.

The band occasionally got together in studios to record their next album.

During the process of recording the next album, they recorded a Christmas cover song that was included in their December setlist; Josef Mohr's "Silent Night." It was released for free download on December 3 on the band's official website.

Meanwhile, Diaz and Goitia participated in Mike Lemus' solo project and No Refuse's band in Punto Fijo.

SXSW, Diaz and "Alibis & Paybacks" CDS (2010–present)
In December 2009, Verona received an invitation to play at SXSW (South by Southwest) in Austin, Texas. This festival showcases hundreds of musical artists from around the world. Verona's showcase was on the Opal Divine's Freehouse venue.

On April 19, 2010, Diaz was formally announced as Candy 66's new bass guitar player on their official web page. He left Verona on September 11, 2010.

On May 2, 2012, Verona released the first single, "Alibis & Paybacks," from their upcoming album.

Members

Current
Chevy – lead vocals, guitar, keyboards
Atari – guitar, backing vocals, keyboards
Eduardo Goitia – drums, percussion

Former
Paúl Jatem – bass guitar
Adolfo Alcalá – bass guitar
Ray Díaz – bass guitar

Discography
Delirium EP (2001)
Summer Consequence (2004)
Anywhere (2008)
"Silent Night" CDS (2009)
"Alibis & Paybacks" CDS (2012)
"Summer Consequence Remastered - 10 Year Anniversary" CDS (2014)

See also
List of alternative rock artists

External links
Official Website

Venezuelan musical groups
Venezuelan rock music groups
Musical groups established in 2001
Musical quartets